Sir Nicholas Parker (1547 – 9 March 1620), eldest son of Thomas Parker of Ratton and Eleanor, daughter of William Waller of Groombridge, was a military commander during the reign of Elizabeth I. He was Sheriff of Sussex in 1586-87, again in 1593-94, and was elected MP for Sussex in 1597.

Career
Parker is first mentioned as commanding the soldiers on board Henry Ughtred's galleon Leicester in Edward Fenton's voyage in 1582 and afterwards served in the army in the Low Countries. He was Sheriff of Sussex, in 1586-7 and 1593-4. He became deputy lieutenant of Sussex in 1587 and was knighted by Lord Willoughby in 1588. 

Parker was master of the ordnance for Willoughby's forces In France in 1589, and was dispatched to Brittany in 1594. He was elected MP for Sussex in 1597. In 1597 he commanded a company of troops in the islands' voyage under Essex, and in October of that year was appointed to command in Sussex, on threat of invasion. 

In 1598, he was appointed deputy lieutenant of Cornwall and governor of Pendennis Castle. In 1602, he was named in the charter of the Virginia Company as one of the adventurers, and another of them, Adrian Moore, married his daughter, Anne. 

He was governor of Plymouth from 1601 to 1603, succeeding Sir Ferdinando Gorges.

Marriages and issue
Parker married three times.
 He married firstly, around 20 January 1573, Jane, daughter of Sir William Courtenay (d. 1557) of Powderham and Elizabeth, daughter of John Paulet, 2nd Marquess of Winchester by his first wife, Elizabeth Willoughby; Jane was sister to Sir William Courtenay (d. 1630) and stepdaughter to Henry Ughtred, son of Sir Anthony Ughtred and his second wife, Elizabeth Seymour, sister of Jane, third consort of Henry VIII.
 He married secondly, Elizabeth, daughter of John Baker;
By his first two marriages he had no issue.
 He married thirdly, Catherine, daughter of Sir John Temple of Stowe, Buckinghamshire, by whom he had five sons and two daughters:
 Sir Thomas Parker (1595–1663), married Philadelphia, daughter of Henry Lennard, 12th Baron Dacre.
 John Parker
 Robert Parker
 Nicholas Parker
 Henry Parker (1604–1652), the Civil War pamphleteer.
 Anne Parker, married firstly, Adrian Moore of Odiham, Hampshire and secondly, Sir John Smith.
 Mary Parker

Death

He died 9 March 1620 at the age of 73 and was buried in the family chapel in Willingdon church. Following his death, a monument was erected in the Willingdon parish church, showing an effigy of him and his three wives. It is one of a group of monuments to the Parker family spanning nearly 150 years.

Notes

Sources

External links

 Monument for Sir Nicholas Parker, St Mary the Virgin, Willingdon at flickr.com
 Llewellyn, Nigel. East Sussex Church Monuments - 1530 to 1830 - Archive of Photographs: Willingdon, St. Mary the Virgin at sussexrecordsociety.org

English MPs 1597–1598
High Sheriffs of Surrey
High Sheriffs of Sussex
1547 births
1620 deaths
People from Willingdon
People from Eastbourne
English knights
Knights Bachelor